With Ears to See and Eyes to Hear is the debut studio album by American rock band Sleeping with Sirens. It was released on March 23, 2010, through Rise Records. The album debuted at number 7 on Billboards Top Heatseekers chart, and at number 36 on Top Independent Albums. It received praise in particular for singer Kellin Quinn's vocals. This is also the only release by the band to feature guitarists Nick Trombino and Brandon McMaster, who have since been replaced by Jesse Lawson and Jack Fowler respectively.

Production
With Ears to See and Eyes to Hear was recorded at Chango Gridlock Studio with producer Cameron Mizell. Mizell acted as engineer, and mixed and mastered the album.

Release
Following the album's conclusion, they embarked on a tour with We Came as Romans, Broadway and Tides of Man. On November 10, 2009, the band announced they had signed to Rise Records; their debut was schueled for release in early 2010. On February 8, 2010, "The Bomb Dot Com v2.0" was posted on the group's Myspace profile. In March and April, the group toured as part of the Royal Family Tour in the US. With Ears to See and Eyes to Hear was made available for streaming on March 22, before being released through Rise Records the following day. On September 9, a music video was released for "With Ears to See, and Eyes to Hear".

Critical reception

With Ears to See and Eyes to Hear was met with generally positive reviews. Gregory Heaney of AllMusic gave the album a 3.5 out of 5 stars. He praises the vocal ability of singer Kellin Quinn stating, "Quinn, whose soaring tenor not only gives the songs a hopeful, uplifting quality, but shows off a vocal talent that could just as easily be making pop records." He ends off by saying, "With Ears to See, and Eyes to Hear is an incredibly solid debut from a band showing plenty of promise right out of the gate." 

Jason Schreurs of Alternative Press magazine gave the album a harsher review. He gave the album a one out of 5 stars. He criticizes the album as a "nonstop assault of mainstream influences into an emo/metalcore sound that, ultimately, sounds best dirty and raw -- not this trite, juvenile, wimpy ear-candy."

The album sold 25,000 copies in its first week in the US.

Track listing
Track listing per booklet.

Personnel
Personnel per booklet.

Sleeping with Sirens
 Kellin Quinn – lead vocals
 Brandon McMaster – lead guitar
 Nick Trombino – rhythm guitar
 Justin Hills – bass
 Gabe Barham – drums

Additional musicians
 Aaron Marsh – additional vocals (track 4)
 David Stephens – additional vocals (track 5)

Production and design
 Cameron Mizell – producer, mixing, engineer, mastering
 Glenn Thomas – art direction, design

Charts

Notes

References

External links

With Ears to See and Eyes to Hear at YouTube (streamed copy where licensed)

2010 debut albums
Sleeping with Sirens albums
Rise Records albums
Albums produced by Cameron Mizell